Yeşilgiresun Belediyespor, more commonly known as Yeşilgiresun, was a Turkish professional basketball club based in Giresun that played in the Turkish Basketball Super League. The team was founded by Giresun Municipality in 2006. Their home arena was 19 Eylül Sports Hall, with a capacity of 3,500 seats.

History
Yeşilgiresun Belediyespor was founded in 2006 by Giresun Municipality. The team began playing in the EBBL for the 2006–2007 season. From 2006 till 2012, the team played in EBBL/TB3L. In the 2011–12 season of TB3L, the team finished the season in third place and lost the chance to be promoted. But season champion Söğüsten Seramik withdrew from the league and Yeşilgiresun was invited to TB2L by TBF. In the 2012–13 season, the team finished third in the regular season. The team beat Darüşşafaka in quarter-final but lost against Trabzonspor in the semi-final and lost the chance to promoted. In the 2013–14 season, the team finished fifth in the regular season. The team beat Akhisar Belediye in the quarter-final but lost against Darüşşafaka Doğuş in the semi-final and lost the chance to be promoted again. In the 2014–15 season, the team finished sixth in the regular season. The team beat Best Balıkesir B.K. in the quarter-final and then beat Sakarya BB in the semi-final and was promoted to the Turkish Basketball League. The team beat Tüyap Büyükçekmece in the final game and won the title.

In the 2017–18 season, the team was relegated from the BSL back to the second tier TBL. In July 2018, the club announced it was shutting down because of financial problems.

Season by season

Players

Notable players

 Barış Güney
 Bora Paçun
 Emircan Koşut
 İnanç Koç
 Okben Ulubay
 Yunus Çankaya
 Josh Heytvelt
 Mike Taylor
 Patrick Miller
 Ramel Bradley
 Anthony Gill 
 Ricky Ledo
 Rašid Mahalbašić
 Tadija Dragićević

References

External links 

 Yeşilgiresun Belediyesi, official website
 Eurobasket.com page
 Facebook page
 Twitter page
 TBLStat.net profile

Basketball teams in Turkey
Basketball teams established in 2006
Sport in Giresun
2006 establishments in Turkey